Arthur Cortes Verocai (born June 17, 1945) is a Brazilian composer, singer, and producer. He is best known for his 1972 self-titled debut album which garnered a cult following during the 2000s in the United Kingdom and the United States.

Career 
In the 1960s and 1970s, Verocai arranged music for artists like Jorge Ben, Gal Costa, Elis Regina, Ivan Lins, Marcos Valle, Quarteto em Cy, O Terço, and Célia.

In 1972, Verocai released his debut self-titled album which he describes as "samba mixed with soul." It contrasted with the music of Tim Maia, who pioneered the sound of Brazilian soul at the time. Verocai's influences for the album were anywhere from jazz musicians like Miles Davis, Bill Evans, and Wes Montgomery to classical artists like Debussy and Heitor Villa-Lobos to American funk and rock musicians like Chicago, Frank Zappa, and Jimmy Webb. Verocai has described himself as "a son of bossa," and was highly influenced by the bossa nova pieces of composers and singers like Tom Jobim and Leny Andrade which can be seen especially on tracks "Velho Parente" and "Que Mapa."

The album was largely ignored in Brazil when it was released which led Verocai to stop composing for 30 years and switch to arranging jingles for adverting instead. In the 2000s though, the album started to achieve a cult-status, with some original vinyl copies selling for £2,000. In 2009, he performed his 1972 album with a 30-piece orchestra at California State University's Luckman Theater in Los Angeles.

Influence 
Verocai has been cited as an influence by TV on the Radio, Cut Chemist, MF DOOM, Madlib, and BADBADNOTGOOD.

Discography

Studio albums

Live albums

As featured artist 

 Hiatus Kaiyote – “Get Sun” from Mood Valiant (Australia, 2021); arranger
 Flor – "Sapiens" (Brazil, 2021)
 BadBadNotGood – Talk Memory (Canada, 2021); arranger

References

External links
 AllMusic biography
 Arthur Verocai at Ubiquity Records

20th-century Brazilian musicians
21st-century Brazilian musicians
20th-century composers
1945 births
Brazilian jazz guitarists
Brazilian male guitarists
Brazilian songwriters
Latin music composers
Living people
Male jazz musicians
Música popular brasileira musical groups
20th-century male musicians
21st-century male musicians
Far Out Recordings artists